Midas, king of Lydia is a figure from Greek mythology.

Midas may also refer to:

Arts and fiction 
 Midas (comics), the name of two fictional characters in the Marvel Universe
 Midas (fictional planet), in the Colony Wars franchise

Film, TV and theatre
 Midas (burletta), a 1760 "mock opera" by Kane O'Hara
 Midas (Lyly play),  an Elizabethan stage play by John Lyly
 Midas (Shelley play), an 1820 play by Mary Shelley and Percy Bysshe Shelley
 Midas (TV series), a 2011 South Korean TV series
 Midas, a rich patron of the arts in the operetta Die schöne Galathée, by Franz von Suppé

Music
 Midas (DJs), a British happy hardcore duo
 Midas (English band), an English indie rock band
 Midas (Japanese band), a Japanese progressive rock band

Places 
 Midas, California, in Placer County, California, United States
 Midas, Kentucky, an unincorporated place in Floyd County, Kentucky, United States
 Midas, Nevada, a ghost town in Elko County, Nevada, United States
 Other name for Midès oasis in Tunisia, the Ancient Numidian city Mades

Companies and transport 
 Midas (automotive service), a chain of automotive service centers
 Midas Cars, a British car manufacturer
 Midas Consoles, a manufacturer of audio consoles
 MIDAS Trial, a randomized controlled trial for drugs and alcohol misuse
 MS Midas, a Finnish cargo ship

Finance 
 Midas (banking system), a core-banking solution from Misys International Banking systems
 Midas formula, a financial-analysis formula
 Midas List, an annual list of dealmakers in high-tech and life science

Acronyms 
 Maximum Integrated Data Acquisition System, an open source data acquisition system used in particle and nuclear physics
 Micro-Imaging Dust Analysis System
 MIDAS (operating system) (Microsoft Interrupt Driven Asynchronous System), a 1979 operating system
 MIDAS Heritage a Monument Inventory Data Standard for recording historic sites
 Missile Defense Alarm System (MiDAS), 1960–1966 American early-warning missile-launch detection system
 Migraine Disability Assessment Test
 Minibus Driver Awareness Scheme, a training and registration scheme for drivers of minibuses
 Mixed-data sampling, an econometric regression or filtering method
 Motorway Incident Detection and Automatic Signalling, a distributed network of traffic sensors
 Multics Intrusion Detection and Alerting System, see Intrusion detection system

Other 
 1981 Midas, an asteroid discovered in 1973
 European Association of Daily Newspapers in Minority and Regional Languages (MIDAS)
 Midas, NATO reporting name for Ilyushin Il-78 aerial refueling tanker
 Midas Touch, originally Midas Touch Golden Elixir, a beer produced by Dogfish Head Brewery
 MidasWWW, one of the first web browsers

See also 
 The Midas Touch (disambiguation)
 Midus, a type of Lithuanian mead